St. Stephen's Church College is a secondary school attached to the Anglican St Stephen's Church in Hong Kong, located between Bonham Road and Pok Fu Lam Road in Sai Ying Pun. The school's total enrollment in the academic year 2009-2010 was approximately 1,000, in 24 classes of two streams (arts and science), across six forms/grades.

Notable alumni
 Wong, Vincent, Hong Kong-based Cantopop singer and actor

See also
 St Stephen's College (Hong Kong)
 St. Stephen's Girls' College

External links
 St. Stephen's Church College official pages（聖公會聖士提反堂中學）

Protestant secondary schools in Hong Kong
Sai Ying Pun
Educational institutions established in 1968